James N. Weinstein is the senior vice president for Microsoft Healthcare. https://www.microsoft.com/en-us/research/people/jweinst/ Before joining Microsoft, he was the chief executive officer and president of Dartmouth–Hitchcock and the Dartmouth–Hitchcock Health System from 2010 until 2017.  He is a member of the National Academy of Medicine and is on the organization's board for Population Health and Public Health Practice. He was the chair of the NAM Committee on Community Based Solutions to Promote Health Equity in the U.S.

Education 
Weinstein graduated from Bradley University with a Bachelor of Science degree in chemistry in 1972. He earned a Doctor of Osteopathic Medicine (D.O.) degree from Chicago College of Osteopathic Medicine in 1977.

In 1994–95, he was at the Dartmouth Medical School Center for the Evaluative Clinical Sciences and achieved an M.S. in health services research.

References

External links 
 Dartmouth-Hitchcock

Living people
American health care chief executives
American osteopathic physicians
American surgeons
Chicago College of Osteopathic Medicine alumni
Bradley University alumni
Geisel School of Medicine alumni
Year of birth missing (living people)
Members of the National Academy of Medicine